Leptoclanis is a genus of moths in the family Sphingidae, containing one species Leptoclanis pulchra, it is known from Brachystegia woodland from Angola and Zimbabwe to Zambia, the Democratic Republic of the Congo and southern Tanzania.

The forewings are 30–35 mm for males and about 40 mm for females. The forewings are creamy green with dark green markings. The hindwings are rosy red, bordered with green. The females are darker than the males and have broader and more rounded wings.

References

Smerinthini
Lepidoptera of Angola
Lepidoptera of the Democratic Republic of the Congo
Lepidoptera of Gabon
Lepidoptera of Tanzania
Lepidoptera of Zambia
Lepidoptera of Zimbabwe
Moths of Sub-Saharan Africa
Monotypic moth genera
Taxa named by Walter Rothschild
Taxa named by Karl Jordan